Swissair Flight 330 was a regularly scheduled flight from Zurich Airport in Kloten, Switzerland, to Hong Kong with a planned stopover in Tel Aviv, Israel. A bomb planted by two members of the PLO exploded soon after takeoff, causing the plane to crash, killing all 47 passengers and crew.

History
On 21 February 1970 HB-ICD a Convair CV-990 Coronado jet named "Baselland" was flying on the route with 38 passengers and nine crew members. A bomb detonated in the aft cargo compartment of the aircraft about nine minutes after take-off, during the ascent on a southerly course at approximately 12:15 UTC in the area of Lucerne north of the St. Gotthard Pass. The crew tried to turn the plane around and attempt an emergency landing at Zürich but had difficulty seeing the instruments due to smoke in the cockpit. The aircraft deviated more and more to the west and crashed a short time later in a wooded area at Würenlingen near Zürich, Switzerland, due to loss of electrical power. All aboard the aircraft were killed.

A Government air inspector was flown to the scene in a helicopter. He was followed shortly afterward by a team of 50 investigators. The police said that a woman handed in a 9-mm. pistol found at the scene of the crash immediately after the disaster. Some of the wreckage, including pieces of cloth, was strung out on the tops and branches of trees.

Sabotage was immediately suspected. A possible motive was revenge against Switzerland for three Palestinians who had been sentenced to 12 years imprisonment by a Swiss court. Swiss news agencies said a splinter group of the Palestinian Liberation Organization (PLO) had claimed responsibility, although other media reports said the group denied involvement.  The Swiss investigating judge, Robert Akeret, personally handed his 165-page report to the federal attorney-general, Hans Walder. According to this report, the bombing was committed by two members of the PLO. 

A barometric-triggered bomb had been used. On the same day, another bomb exploded aboard an Austrian Airlines Vienna-bound Caravelle after takeoff from Frankfurt. The Caravelle landed safely.

Air Traffic Control Transcript
'(Start of conversation with Zurich ATC, Note: Conversation of the recording begins following the initial explosion).

Swissair 330: Ah, 330 we have a problem with the cabin compression we have to return to Zurich.

Zurich ATC: Roger, what is your actual level?

Swissair 330: 140, Request return corse.

Zurich ATC: Roger then make a, right turn Swissair 330.

Swissair 330: Zurich from Swissair 330, We suspect an explosion in the aft compartment of the aircraft, errr everything is ok at the moment. We request immediate descent and firefighting equipment on the ground...For landing.

Zurich ATC: Swissair 330 say again please?

Swissair 330: Ur Swissair 330 we request the police to, urr.....investigate the incident.

Swissair 330: Zurich Swissair 330 we have fire on board....Request an immediate landing.

Swissair 330: This is an emergency Zurich from 330.

Swissair 330: Zurich, we have an electric control ur...Issues, 330, 330.

Zurich ATC: (Unitelligable) 

(Both ATC and Pilot keyed microphones at the same time creating a small heterodyne).

(Muffled voice from Swissair crew indicates either issues with the radio or the pilots speaking through their oxygen masks).

Zurich ATC: Swissair 330, Swissair 330. I cannot read you anymore, I can not read you anymore, Please continue your heading uh 322
(sound of microphone squeal).

Zurich ATC: Swissair 330 ur-(Unitelligable sound).

Swissair 330: Uh 330, can you give me my position now?

Zurich ATC: You are passing about 1000ft-(Loud squeal) (unintelligible).

Zurich ATC: Roger 330, what is your heading now?

Swissair 330: Declaring an emergency! We have fire and smoke, I can't see anything!

Swissair 330: 330 is crashing!

Swissair 330: goodbye everybody, Argh!.....goodbye everybody. (last transmission from aircraft).

Zurich ATC: Swissair 330, heading 080 please.

Zurich ATC: Swissair 330, please open your window please, Swissair 330 open your window please.

Zurich ATC: Swissair 330, I cannot read you anymore.

(End of Recording).

A segment of the recording is publicly available on sites such as YouTube.

Postal history
As noted in Kibble (The Arab Israeli Conflict: No Service, Returned & Captured Mail, 2014) - On 21 February 1970 Swissair Flight 330 left Zürich, Switzerland, bound for Tel Aviv, Israel. A bomb exploded in the rear cargo compartment nine minutes after take-off. The crew attempted to turn the plane around and undertake an emergency landing at Zürich, but it crashed a short time later in a wooded area at Würenlingen, near Zürich. A bomb with an altimeter trigger was placed in a package mailed to an Israeli address by Palestinian extremists. All 47 persons on board (38 passengers and 9 crew) were killed. A small amount of mail was recovered from the crash and is highly prized by collectors of crash mail.

A black instructional marking in French was applied to any mail that survived the crash, which translated reads:

The Coronado bombing saw a change in mailing practices across the globe. In particular, mail sent or routed to Israel through the UK, Italy, and the USA was required to be sent by surface mail in the immediate future. Airmail to Israel was no longer permitted.

A report from the Jewish Telegraphic Agency titled Airmail from Europe Fails to Arrive in Israel Despite Assurances It Would from 25 February 1970 states the following:

See also 
Timeline of airliner bombing attacks

References

External links
flight 330 report
 Huber, Daniel. "«We are crashing - goodbye everybody»." 20 Minuten. 19 February 2010
Video of the crash site from Associated Press Archive

1970 in Switzerland
1970 murders in Switzerland
Airliner bombings
Aviation accidents and incidents in 1970
Accidents and incidents involving the Convair 990 Coronado
Aviation accidents and incidents in Switzerland
Explosions in 1970
February 1970 crimes
February 1970 events in Europe
Mass murder in 1970
Mass murder in Switzerland
Palestinian terrorist incidents in Europe
330
Terrorist incidents in Europe in 1970
Terrorist incidents in Switzerland
Attacks on aircraft by Palestinian militant groups